Progress M-20M, identified by NASA as Progress 52P, is a Progress spacecraft used by Roskosmos to resupply the International Space Station (ISS) during 2013. Progress M-20M was built by RKK Energia. Progress M-20M was launched on a 6-hours rendezvous profile towards the ISS. The 20th Progress-M 11F615A60 spacecraft to be launched, it had the serial number 420 and was built by RKK Energia.

Launch
The spacecraft was launched on 27 July 2013 at 20:45 UTC from the Baikonur Cosmodrome in Kazakhstan. The launch was the first out of Baikonur since a disastrous Proton-M failure on 2 July 2013.

Docking
Progress M-20M docked with the Pirs docking compartment on 28 July 2013 at 02:26 UTC, less than six hours after launch.

Cargo
Some last minute items were added to the Progress to assist the station astronauts with figuring out why the cooling system on one of the American spacesuits sprung a leak and caused a spacewalk to be aborted the previous week.

Undocking and reentry
Progress M-20M undocked from the ISS on 3 February 2014.

References

Progress (spacecraft) missions
Spacecraft launched in 2013
Spacecraft which reentered in 2014
Spacecraft launched by Soyuz-U rockets
Supply vehicles for the International Space Station